The Wyandotte Building is a historic building in Downtown Columbus, Ohio. It was considered the city's first skyscraper, built in 1897-1898 and designed by Daniel Burnham's architectural firm. It is listed on the National Register of Historic Places.

History 
The Wyandotte Building was built by Deshler National Bank and Associates and opened in 1898, and named for the Wyandot people. It was Columbus' first steel-frame skyscraper at 11-stories. The steel frame building with a tile framed entry is part of the Chicago School of architecture and was built to be fireproof. The facade has vertical rows of bay windows which are intended to provide light, ventilation and extra floor space. The interior has rich wood and marble finishes with terra cotta trimmed arched entries.

It was a commercial failure and in 1916, it was sold to the State of Ohio for use as an office building. The building was surveyed for the Historic American Buildings Survey in 1955. In 1979, it was extensively renovated after the state moved out to the Rhodes State Office Tower in 1974.

In 2014, Huntington Bancshares purchased the building for $3.6 million.

Gallery

See also
 National Register of Historic Places listings in Columbus, Ohio

References

External links

1898 establishments in Ohio
National Register of Historic Places in Columbus, Ohio
Buildings and structures completed in 1898
Chicago school architecture in Ohio
Buildings in downtown Columbus, Ohio
Broad Street (Columbus, Ohio)